Chinari is a village and hill station in Hattian Bala District, Azad Kashmir, Pakistan.

The village is accessible from Muzaffarabad by Muzaffarabad-Chakothi road. Some private hotels with basic facilities are located here for tourists stay.

References

Populated places in Jhelum Valley District